Country Club Tasmania is a casino in Launceston, Tasmania, owned by Federal Hotels. It is Tasmania's second casino. It is also used for a variety of local events and is home to an 18-hole golf course. Targa Tasmania uses the casino as a starting point for the race.

The casino licence was originally supposed to be granted to a rival to Federal Hotels, who own the license to the Hobart casino, as well as a monopoly over all poker machines in the state. However, through successful lobbying the license for the second casino was also given to Federal Hotels. The casino was soon dominated by over 500 poker machines on the floor.

At the 2018 election, Rebecca White, the Labor opposition leader is promising to remove all pokies from pubs and clubs leaving the two casinos as the only location for pokies. They cite the research that shows improved health and economic benefits for this policy. Federal Hotels, the owners of the poker machines, and the Liberal premier, Will Hodgman, oppose the policy.

See also
 1968 Tasmanian casino referendum

Further reading

References

Casinos completed in 1982
Hotels in Launceston
Casinos in Australia
Tourist attractions in Tasmania
1982 establishments in Australia